Common Ground is the thirteenth studio album by the English progressive rock band Big Big Train, released on 30 July 2021. With the departure of Dave Gregory, Rachel Hall, and Danny Manners in 2020, Common Ground is the first album release with the core four-piece lineup of Greg Spawton, David Longdon, Nick D'Virgilio, and Rikard Sjöblom. Joining the core line-up on the album are session musicians Carly Bryant, Dave Foster, and Aidan O'Rourke. Upon release it entered the UK music charts at number 31.

It was elected by PopMatters as the ninth best progressive rock/metal album of 2021.

Track listing

Charts

Personnel
Production and performance credits are adapted from the album liner notes.

Big Big Train
 Nick D'Virgilio – drums, percussion, vocals
 David Longdon – lead vocals, acoustic guitar, Mellotron, synthesiser, piano, vibraphone, tambourine, flute 
 Rikard Sjöblom – keyboards, piano, synthesiser, Hammond organ, electric 6 and 12 string guitars, vocals
 Greg Spawton – bass guitar, bass pedals

Additional musicians
 Carly Bryant – vocals on tracks 1-4,7-9
 Dave Foster – guitars on tracks 1,8
 Aidan O'Rourke – violin, soundscapes on tracks 1,2,4,6-9

Brass band
Dave Desmond – trombone
Stuart Roberts – trumpet
Nick Stones – French horn
John Storey – euphonium
Jon Truscott – tuba

Production
 Rob Aubrey – mixing, mastering, engineering
 Shawn Dealey – engineering
 Patrick Phillips – engineering
 Stuart Hamilton – engineering
 Dave Desmond – brass arrangements on tracks 6,9

References

2021 albums
Big Big Train albums